The 25th parallel north is a circle of latitude that is 25 degrees north of the Earth's equatorial plane. It crosses Africa, Asia, the Indian Ocean, the Pacific Ocean, North America and the Atlantic Ocean.

The northernmost section of the border between Mauritania and Mali is defined by the parallel.

At this latitude the sun is visible for 13 hours, 42 minutes during the summer solstice and 10 hours, 35 minutes during the winter solstice.

Around the world
Starting at the Prime Meridian and heading eastwards, the parallel 25° north passes through:

{| class="wikitable plainrowheaders"
! scope="col" width="125" | Co-ordinates
! scope="col" | Country, territory or sea
! scope="col" | Notes
|-
| 
! scope="row" | 
|
|-
| 
! scope="row" | 
|
|-
| 
! scope="row" | 
|
|-
| style="background:#b0e0e6;" | 
! scope="row" style="background:#b0e0e6;" | Red Sea
| style="background:#b0e0e6;" |
|-
| 
! scope="row" | 
|
|-
| style="background:#b0e0e6;" | 
! scope="row" style="background:#b0e0e6;" | Persian Gulf
| style="background:#b0e0e6;" | Gulf of Bahrain
|-
| 
! scope="row" | 
|
|-
| style="background:#b0e0e6;" | 
! scope="row" style="background:#b0e0e6;" | Persian Gulf
| style="background:#b0e0e6;" |
|-
| 
! scope="row" | 
|
|-
| style="background:#b0e0e6;" | 
! scope="row" style="background:#b0e0e6;" | Indian Ocean
| style="background:#b0e0e6;" | Arabian Sea
|-valign="top"
| 
! scope="row" | 
| Balochistan - for about 16 km Sindh - passing just north of Karachi
|-valign="top"
| 
! scope="row" | 
| Rajasthan Madhya Pradesh Uttar Pradesh Bihar Jharkhand West Bengal
|-
| 
! scope="row" | 
|
|-valign="top"
| 
! scope="row" | 
| Assam Manipur
|-
| 
! scope="row" |  (Burma)
|
|-valign="top"
| 
! scope="row" | 
| Yunnan - passing just to the south of Kunming  Guizhou Guangxi Hunan Guangdong Jiangxi Fujian
|-
| style="background:#b0e0e6;" | 
! scope="row" style="background:#b0e0e6;" | South China Sea
| style="background:#b0e0e6;" | Taiwan Strait
|-valign="top"
| 
! scope="row" |  (Taiwan)
| Island of Taiwan (so claimed by ) - passing just south of Taipei
|-valign="top"
| style="background:#b0e0e6;" | 
! scope="row" style="background:#b0e0e6;" | Pacific Ocean
| style="background:#b0e0e6;" | Passing just north of Miyako-jima,  Passing just north of Iwo Jima, 
|-
| 
! scope="row" | 
| Passing through the islet of Little Rock, Gardner Pinnacles, Hawaii
|-valign="top"
| style="background:#b0e0e6;" | 
! scope="row" style="background:#b0e0e6;" | Pacific Ocean
| style="background:#b0e0e6;" |
|-valign="top"
| 
! scope="row" | 
| Isla MagdalenaBaja California Sur mainlandIsla San José
|-
| style="background:#b0e0e6;" | 
! scope="row" style="background:#b0e0e6;" | Gulf of California
| style="background:#b0e0e6;" |
|-
| 
! scope="row" | 
| Isla Altamura Isla Talchichitle SinaloaDurangoCoahuilaNuevo LeónTamaulipas
|-
| style="background:#b0e0e6;" | 
! scope="row" style="background:#b0e0e6;" | Gulf of Mexico
| style="background:#b0e0e6;" |
|-
| 
! scope="row" | 
| Island of Key Largo, Florida
|-
| style="background:#b0e0e6;" | 
! scope="row" style="background:#b0e0e6;" | Atlantic Ocean
| style="background:#b0e0e6;" | Straits of Florida
|-
| 
! scope="row" | 
| Island of Andros
|-
| style="background:#b0e0e6;" | 
! scope="row" style="background:#b0e0e6;" | Atlantic Ocean
| style="background:#b0e0e6;" |
|-
| 
! scope="row" | 
| Island of New Providence - passing just south of Nassau
|-
| style="background:#b0e0e6;" | 
! scope="row" style="background:#b0e0e6;" | Atlantic Ocean
| style="background:#b0e0e6;" |
|-
| 
! scope="row" | 
| Island of Eleuthera
|-
| style="background:#b0e0e6;" | 
! scope="row" style="background:#b0e0e6;" | Atlantic Ocean
| style="background:#b0e0e6;" |
|-
| 
! scope="row" | Western Sahara
|-
| 
! scope="row" | 
|
|-valign="top"
| 
! scope="row" |  /  border
|
|-
| 
! scope="row" | 
|
|}

See also
24th parallel north
26th parallel north

References

n25
Mali–Mauritania border